Vicky & Vetaal is an Indian Supernatural Sitcom series which premiered on Disney Channel India. The series is produced by Cinevistaas Limited was launched on 7 October 2006 as the first major original production of the network, and Disney's first locally produced live action Hindi language series. The show was planned to be the first of a string of five local productions due to get released within a year's span, and was followed by Dhoom Machaao Dhoom, Agadam Bagdam Tigdam, Break Time Masti Time and Nach to the Groove.
The series stars Dev Kantawala as Vicky and Vishal Malhotra as Vetaal.
The season 2 of the series premiered on Disney Channel on 15 November 2015 with different cast.

The show is based on the Baital Pachisi collection of tales about the semi-legendary King Vikram, identified as Vikramāditya, and the Vetala, a huge vampire-like being.

Synopsis

Season 1
The main characters of the series are Vicky (Dev Kantawala), a brave and intelligent sixth standard boy and Vetaal (Vishal Malhotra), a friendly but foolish ghost whom only Vicky can see. Vicky released Vetaal accidentally after Vetaal had been hanging from a tree in a school for 300 years and since then their fate has been tied together (much to their dismay) and they have to go along together everywhere followed by "Paddu", Vetaal's living book of magic. The episodes mostly revolves around mishaps in Vicky's life and Vetaal's brave but foolish attempts to save the day often leading to additional troubles for Vicky.

The series is primarily a comedy series with stand-alone episodes. It was one of the favourites among kids hosted by Disney channel at that time.

Season 2
Vicky and his family move into their new house but Vicky and his grandma Gomti are upset about leaving their friends behind when they bump into the 300 year old ghost, Vetaal and his companion, the 1000 year old book of spells, Paddu. They realise that only they can see them and that this has been Vetaal and Paddu’s home for years. After a lot of confusion and scary moments, eventually all 4 realise that each of them are harmless and end up becoming friends and excited to be living together in one house.

Cast

Season 1 
 Vishal Malhotra as Veetal
 Dev Kantawala as Vikram "Vicky" Sharma 
 Damandeep Singh Baggan as the voice of Paddu
 Girish Pardeshi as Anil Sharma
 Pubali Sanyal as Shikha Sharma
 Jai Thakkar as Siddheshwaran "Sid" Khanna
 Yash Shah as Ashish
 Shivani Joshi as Meghna
 Kritika Sharma as Sanjana
 Suhail More as Jumbo
 Swapnali Kulkarni as Sabha
 Aakansha Kapil as Malika Ma'am
 Kenneth Desai as Principal Kapoor

Season 2 
 Devansh Doshi as Veetal and Betaal
 Sadhil Kapoor as Vikram 'Vicky' Sharma
 Mazel Vyas as Jelly Sharma (Vicky's sister)
 Shanur as the voice of Paddu

Broadcast
The series also re-aired on Disney XD, Jetix and Hungama TV.

References

Children's comedy television series
Disney Channel (Indian TV channel) original programming
2006 Indian television series debuts
2007 Indian television series endings
Children's fantasy television series
Television about magic
Indian fantasy television series
Vampires in television
Jetix original programming
Ghosts in television
Indian television series about Hindu deities